William Evans Graham  was an Ireland men's field hockey international. He was a member of the Ireland team that played at the 1908 Summer Olympics, winning a silver medal. Graham also won Irish Senior Cup titles with both Palmerstown and Monkstown. He later served as an Ireland selector before becoming President of the Irish Hockey Union during the 1933–34 season. He was club president at Monkstown from 1927 until 1936. Graham was also a medical doctor.

Domestic teams
Graham first played field hockey at Kingstown Grammar School before joining Palmerstown. He subsequently helped Palmerstown win the Irish Senior Cup. After the club disbanded in 1907, Graham and most of the Palmerstown squad  moved to Monkstown where he won two more Irish Senior Cup titles in 1911 and 1914. His team mates at Palmerstown and Monkstown included J.E. Mills and the Peterson brothers, most notably Jack and Walter.

Ireland international
Between 1907 and 1909 Graham made 10 senior appearances for Ireland. Graham was a member of the Ireland team that played at the 1908 Summer Olympics, winning a silver medal. Ireland defeated Wales 3–1 in a semi-final before losing 8–1 to England in the final.

Honours
Ireland
Summer Olympics
Runners Up: 1908: 1 
Monkstown
Irish Senior Cup
Winners: 1910, 1914: 2 
Palmerstown
Irish Senior Cup
Winners: 1904–05: 1 ?

Notes
 Some sources give his middle name as Ernest.

References

External links
 

1886 births
1947 deaths
Ireland international men's field hockey players
Irish male field hockey players
Members of the Ireland hockey team at the 1908 Summer Olympics
Medalists at the 1908 Summer Olympics
Olympic silver medallists for Great Britain
Monkstown Hockey Club players
Field hockey players from County Dublin
Male field hockey midfielders
20th-century Irish medical doctors
Irish field hockey administrators